Stambler is a surname. Notable people with the surname include:

Howard Stambler
Bruce Stambler, American sound editor